Meadow Park may refer to:

Meadow Park (Borehamwood), home ground of Boreham Wood F.C. and Arsenal Women F.C.
Meadow Park, Coatbridge, former home ground of Albion Rovers
Meadow Park, Dumbarton, home ground of Dumbarton Harp
Meadow Park, Gloucester, former home ground of Gloucester City A.F.C.